Gamma Pavonis, Latinized from γ Pavonis, is a star in the southern circumpolar constellation of Pavo. With an apparent visual magnitude of 4.22, it is a fourth-magnitude star and thereby visible to the naked eye. It is drifting closer to the Sun with a radial velocity of −30 km/s.

Compared to the Sun, this star has a 21% greater mass and a 15% larger radius. It is a brighter star with 152% of the Sun's luminosity, which is it radiating from the outer envelope at an effective temperature of 6,112 K. The stellar classification of F9 V puts it in the class of F-type main sequence stars that generate energy through the nuclear fusion of hydrogen at the core. It is a metal-poor star, which means it has a low abundance of elements heavier than helium. Age estimates range from a low of a billion years up to 7.25 billion years. Gamma Pavonis is orbiting through the Milky Way at an unusually high peculiar velocity relative to nearby stars.

This star has rank 14 on TPF-C's top 100 target stars to search for a rocky planet in the Habitable Zone, approximately 1.2 AU, or a little beyond an Earth-like orbit.

References

External links
 Gamma Pavonis SolStation entry.
 ARICNS

F-type main-sequence stars
Pavonis, Gamma
Suspected variables

Pavo (constellation)
Pavonis, Gamma
Durchmusterung objects
0827
203608
105858
8181